Sergio Abel Peralta (born 1 March 1989) is an Argentine professional footballer who plays as a midfielder for Sportivo Peñarol.

Career
Peralta's first career club were Independiente Rivadavia, who he joined in 2008. He entered the club's first-team in June 2009, featuring in Primera B Nacional matches against Almagro and Atlético de Rafaela. In his third season, 2010–11, Peralta scored two goals, including his first versus Unión Santa Fe on 21 August 2010. In total, Peralta scored six goals in one hundred and twenty-one appearances in all competitions for Independiente Rivadavia. On 3 July 2015, Peralta signed for Temperley of the Argentine Primera División. Twenty-four appearances and three goals in three seasons followed.

In July 2017, Peralta joined fellow Primera División side Patronato. He made his debut on 27 August during a defeat to San Martín, before scoring his first goal on 19 February 2018 against Chacarita Juniors.

Career statistics
.

References

External links

1989 births
Living people
Sportspeople from Mendoza, Argentina
Argentine footballers
Association football midfielders
Primera Nacional players
Argentine Primera División players
Independiente Rivadavia footballers
Club Atlético Temperley footballers
Club Atlético Patronato footballers
Estudiantes de Buenos Aires footballers